The Woman Who Had No Childhood is a 1957 Mexican comedy drama film directed by Tito Davison and starring Libertad Lamarque and Pedro Armendáriz.

Plot
When her husband dies, a woman (Libertad Lamarque) inherits his fortune, but enters a deep emotional crisis that makes her act like a child. Her lawyer (Pedro Armendáriz) will be in charge of protecting her interests against those of her late husband's selfish and fortune-seeking relatives while helping her recover from her condition, since he is secretly in love with her.

Cast
 Libertad Lamarque as Rosaura
 Pedro Armendáriz as Lic. Alberto Garza Cifuentes
 Elsa Cárdenas as Luisa
 Freddy Fernández as Alberto hijo
 Andrea Palma as Matilde
 Anita Blanch as Clotilde
 José Baviera as Andrés
 Carlos Martínez Baena as Board Representative
 Ignacio Peón as Nicolás, butler
 Nicolás Rodríguez as José de la Vega, adviser
 Emilio Gaete as Dr. Salazar
 Armando Arriola as Alejandrito
 José Pardavé as Ice Cream Seller
 Rogelio Jiménez Pons as Pepito (as Niño Rogelio Jiménez Pons)
 Magda Donato as La nena Rendón
 Sara Cabrera as Eduviges
 Enrique Díaz Indiano as Doctor
 Armando Velasco as Dr. Andrade
 Daniel Arroyo as Daniel Treviño de Velasco (uncredited)
 León Barroso as Waiter (uncredited)
 Lonka Becker como Gringa in restaurant (uncredited)
 Alfonso Carti como Waiter (uncredited)
 Roy Fletcher como Announcer (uncredited)
 Pepita González como Matilde's Friend (uncredited)
 Leonor Gómez como Cook (uncredited)
 Ana María Hernández como Matilde's Friend (uncredited)
 Bertha Lehar como Juanita, maid (uncredited)
 Elvira Lodi como Woman in restaurant (uncredited)
 Miguel Manzano como Judge (uncredited)
 Concepción Martínez como Carmencita (uncredited)
 Álvaro Matute como Man in restaurant (uncredited)
 Consuelo Monteagudo como Chelito, Matilde's friend (uncredited)
 Carlos Robles Gil como Council Member (uncredited)
 Aurora Ruiz como Crescencia, Alberto's maid (uncredited)

References

External links

1950s Spanish-language films
1957 comedy-drama films
1957 films
Mexican comedy-drama films
Films directed by Tito Davison
Mexican black-and-white films
1950s Mexican films